Marco Felder (born 3 December 1974) is a Liechtensteiner luger. He competed in the men's singles event at the 1994 Winter Olympics.

References

External links
 

1974 births
Living people
Liechtenstein male lugers
Olympic lugers of Liechtenstein
Lugers at the 1994 Winter Olympics
Place of birth missing (living people)